Paola Moreno Perez (born 22 August 1985) is a Colombian professional golfer.

Amateur career
Moreno played college golf at the University of Southern California where she was on the 2008 NCAA Division I Championship team. She was a two-time All-American. As an amateur, she finished T42 at the 2008 U.S. Women's Open.

Professional career
Moreno has won three times on the Symetra Tour. She finished 2nd on the 2012 Symetra Tour money list to earn her tour card to play on the 2013 LPGA Tour where she qualified for the 2013 CME Group Titleholders.

She also finished T51 at the 2013 LPGA Championship.

International career
In 2014, Moreno individually took bronze in golf at the 2014 Central American and Caribbean Games.

She won a gold medal in the mixed team event at the 2015 Pan American Games.

Amateur wins
2002 Junior World Golf Championships (Girls 15–17)
2004 Colombian Open, Colombian National Championship
2005 Colombian Open
2006 Colombian Open, South American Championship
2007 Texas A&M "Mo"Morial
2008 Pac-10 Championship

Source:

Professional wins

Symetra Tour wins
2010 Texas Hill Country Classic
2012 Eagle Classic
2016 Tullymore Classic

Team appearances
Amateur
Espirito Santo Trophy (representing Colombia): 2004, 2008

References

External links
Symetra Tour profile

Colombian female golfers
USC Trojans women's golfers
LPGA Tour golfers
Pan American Games medalists in golf
Pan American Games gold medalists for Colombia
Medalists at the 2015 Pan American Games
Golfers at the 2015 Pan American Games
Golfers at the 2019 Pan American Games
Sportspeople from Cali
1985 births
Living people
21st-century Colombian women